This is a list of notable peer-reviewed academic journals related to urban, regional, land-use, transportation and environmental planning and to urban studies, regional science.

See also 
 List of environmental social science journals
 List of environmental journals

 
Planning journals